Alana Spencer (born 11 February 1992) is an entrepreneur from Aberystwyth. She is notable for winning the twelfth series of BBC One's The Apprentice in 2016. The programme's first Welsh winner, Spencer received a £250,000 investment from Lord Sugar for her luxury cake and chocolate business, Ridiculously Rich by Alana.

Early life
She grew up in Loughborough and Llanrhystud, Ceredigion and attended Ysgol Gyfun Aberaeron for her education where, aged 16, she took her first chocolate order for one of her teachers.

References 

1992 births
Living people
The Apprentice (British TV series) candidates
People from Aberystwyth
The Apprentice (franchise) winners